Amalthe is a village situated in the Dhule district of the Indian state Maharashtra. It is located on the bank of the Tapti River, 9 km away from the north side of Shindkheda town.

References 

Villages in Dhule district